This is a list of all lighthouses in the U.S. state of Rhode Island as identified by the United States Coast Guard. There are fifteen active lights in the state as well as two skeleton towers erected to replace earlier staffed lighthouses.

The first lighthouse in the state was erected in 1749 and the last in 1962 (ignoring automated towers erected later); the oldest surviving structure is the much-modified Poplar Point Light, although the tower now standing at Prudence Island Light was first erected at Goat Island in 1824. The tallest extant tower is that at Beavertail Light, though the focal plane of the Block Island Southeast Light is much higher on account of the bluffs upon which it sits.

If not otherwise noted, focal height and coordinates are taken from the United States Coast Guard Light List, while location and dates of activation, automation, and deactivation are taken from the United States Coast Guard historical information site for lighthouses. Locations of demolished lights have been estimated using National Oceanic and Atmospheric Administration (NOAA) navigational charts.

See also
List of lighthouses in the United States
List of tallest lighthouses in the United States

References

Rhode Island
 
Lighthouses
Lighthouses